The Nazaré Canyon is an undersea canyon just off the coast of Nazaré, Portugal, in the eastern North Atlantic Ocean.

The canyon is being studied as part of the EU HERMES project using a remotely operated vehicle. The project is investigating the specialized canyon ecosystems, sediment transport and deposition, and the way in which the canyon influences and is affected by local ocean circulation.

Sections

The canyon can be divided into three distinct sections. In this section, the canyon retains a V shape and is highly sinuous, with large ravines on the walls bordering the deepest part that defines the canyon's axis (called the thalweg). In this section, the thalweg loses the sharp characteristics of the shallower sections, shifting from a V-shaped profile to a flat, slightly sinuous floor.

Dynamics
The Nazaré Canyon functions as a ripple polarizer. Waves are able to travel at a much greater speed due to the geological fault, arriving at the coast with virtually no dissipation of energy. Praia do Norte consistently presents waves significantly larger than the rest of the Portuguese coast due to the canyon. The predominant northern currents function as sedimentary ducts, along which there is an intensification of the particle transport processes between the coastal zone and the deep sea domain, making the transport of particulate matter (sediments) throughout the entire canyon very efficient. This underwater gorge causes major changes in the level of coastal sedimentary traffic, acting as a sink for sediments from the north, from coastal drift; this also explains the absence of large stretches of sand on the beaches south of Nazaré.

The importance and interest in the natural phenomenon led the Portuguese Hydrographic Institute (IH), in collaboration with the Municipality of Nazaré, to install an exhibition that illustrates the knowledge acquired from the research carried out in the area. The Nazaré Canyon Interpretive Center, installed in one of the fort's rooms, houses informational posters, a three-dimensional model of the underwater valley and images and information about the German submarine U-963, which sunk in Nazaré's waters at the end of World War II.

Surfing

One of the most distinct features of this canyon is the high breaking waves it forms. This makes Nazaré, specifically Praia do Norte, a hotspot for big wave surfing.

In November 2011, Hawaiian surfer Garrett McNamara surfed a record breaking giant wave:  from trough to crest, at Praia do Norte, Nazaré, Portugal. In January 2013, it was reported he successfully rode a wave measuring an estimated  at the same location, possibly exceeding the size of his previous record-breaking wave.

In January 2018, Hugo Vau might have smashed a world record amid claims he surfed one of the biggest waves ever seen at Nazaré, Portugal. The wave — nicknamed ‘Big Mama’ — was reported to be up to 35 metres high, which, if confirmed, would beat current Guinness Book of Records holder Garrett McNamara.

Brazilian surfer Rodrigo Koxa has officially broken the world record for the world's biggest wave ever to have been surfed, with his incredible run at Nazare beach in Portugal being recognized as a Guinness World Record.

The 73.5-foot wave she surfed on February 11 in Nazaré was the largest wave surfed by anyone that year, earning Gabeira the WSL's 2020 women's XXL Biggest Wave Award. By contrast, that year's men's XXL Biggest Wave Award winner, Kai Lenny, rode a 70-foot wave.

See also 
 Nazaré, Portugal
 Praia do Norte (Nazaré)

References

  BBC - Garrett McNamara surfs 'highest ever' wave off Portugal.
 Robot sub explores giant canyon Shukman, David, (2007, June 19). In BBC News Online. Retrieved 02:02, June 20, 2007, from 
 Physical processes in the Nazare Canyon area and related sedimentary impacts Vitorino, J., A. Oliveira and J. Beja, Geophysical Research Abstracts, Vol. 7, 10187, 2005 SRef-ID: 1607-7962/gra/EGU05-A-10187

External links
 EU HERMES

Landforms of the Atlantic Ocean
Submarine canyons of the Atlantic Ocean